Happy Times is an album by jazz pianist Junior Mance which was recorded in 1962 and released on the Jazzland label.

Reception

Allmusic awarded the album 4 stars with the review by Al Campbell stating: "Pianist Junior Mance was in excellent company on this inspired 1962 session with bassist Ron Carter and drummer Mickey Roker. It's unfortunate this trio only recorded together on this one date as their unity propels the blues, gospel, and bebop ideas Mance consistently feeds them".

Track listing
All compositions are by Junior Mance except where indicated.
 "Happy Time" - 6:17     
 "Jitterbug Waltz" (Fats Waller) - 5:22     
 "Out South" - 5:28     
 "Tin Tin Deo" (Gil Fuller, Dizzy Gillespie, Chano Pozo) - 4:42     
 "For Dancers Only" (Sy Oliver, Don Raye, Vic Schoen) - 5:50     
 "Taggie's Tune" - 4:39     
 "Azure-Te" (Bill Davis, Donald Wolf) - 5:36     
 "The Simple Waltz" (Bob Brookmeyer, Clark Terry) - 5:20

Personnel
Junior Mance - piano
Ron Carter - bass
Mickey Roker - drums

References

 

1962 albums
Junior Mance albums
Jazzland Records (1960) albums
Albums produced by Orrin Keepnews